Misheh Pareh Rural District is in the Central District of Kaleybar County, East Azerbaijan province, Iran. At the National Census of 2006, its population was 3,034 in 665 households. There were 3,137 inhabitants in 929 households at the following census of 2011. At the most recent census of 2016, the population of the rural district was 2,757 in 920 households. The largest of its 41 villages was Oskelu, with 393 people.

References 

Kaleybar County

Rural Districts of East Azerbaijan Province

Populated places in East Azerbaijan Province

Populated places in Kaleybar County